The biblical Book of Genesis speaks of the relationship between fraternal twins Jacob and Esau, sons of Isaac and Rebecca. The story focuses on Esau's loss of his birthright to Jacob and the conflict that ensued between their descendant nations because of Jacob's deception of their aged and blind father, Isaac, in order to receive Esau's birthright/blessing from Isaac.

This conflict was paralleled by the affection the parents had for their favored child: "Isaac, who had a taste for wild game, loved Esau, but Rebekah loved Jacob." Even since conception, their conflict was foreshadowed: "And the children struggled together within her; and she said, If it be so, why am I thus? And the  said unto her, Two nations are in thy womb, and two manner of people shall be separated from thy bowels; and the one people shall be stronger than the other people; and the elder shall serve the younger."

Genesis 25:26 states that Esau was born before Jacob, who came out holding on to his older brother's heel as if he was trying to pull Esau back into the womb so that he could be firstborn. The name Jacob means "he grasps the heel" which is a Hebrew idiom for deceptive behavior.

Birthright

In Genesis, Esau returned to his brother, Jacob, being famished from the fields. He begged his twin brother to give him some "red pottage" (paralleling his nickname, adom, meaning "red"). Jacob offered to give Esau a bowl of stew in exchange for his birthright (the right to be recognized as firstborn) and Esau agreed.

The birthright (bekorah) has to do with both position and inheritance. By birthright, the firstborn son inherited the leadership of the family and the judicial authority of his father. Deuteronomy 21:17 states that he was also entitled to a double portion of the paternal inheritance.

In the interpretation of Daniel J. Elazar, Esau acts impulsively: "Esau demonstrates that he does not deserve to be the one who continues Abraham's responsibilities and rewards under God's covenant, since he does not have the steady, thoughtful qualities which are required... Jacob shows his willingness as well as his greater intelligence and forethought... What he does is not quite honorable, though not illegal. The title that he gains is at least partially valid, although he is insecure enough about it to conspire later with his mother to deceive his father so as to gain the blessing for the first-born as well."

Later, Esau marries two wives, both Hittite women, that is, locals, in violation of Abraham's (and God's) injunction not to take wives from among the Canaanite population. Again, one gets the sense of a headstrong person who acts impulsively, without sufficient thought. His marriage is described as a vexation to both Rebecca and Isaac. Even his father, who has strong affection for him, is hurt by his act. According to Daniel J. Elazar this action alone forever rules out Esau as the bearer of patriarchal continuity. Esau could have overcome the sale of his birthright; Isaac was still prepared to give him the blessing due the firstborn. But acquiring foreign wives meant the detachment of his children from the Abrahamic line. Despite the deception on the part of Jacob and his mother to gain Isaac's patriarchal blessing, Jacob's vocation as Isaac's legitimate heir in the continued founding of the Jewish people is reaffirmed.

Elazar suggests the Bible indicates that a bright, calculating person, even if he is less than honest at times, is preferable as a founder over a bluff, impulsive one who cannot make discriminating choices.

Blessing of the firstborn

Pronouncing the blessing was considered to be the act formally acknowledging the firstborn as the principal heir.

In Genesis 27:5–7, Rebecca overhears Isaac tell Esau, "Bring me venison and prepare a savoury food, that I may eat, and bless thee before the  before my death." Rebecca counsels Jacob to pretend to be Esau, in order to obtain the blessing in his brother's stead. He dressed himself in Esau's best clothes and disguised himself by covering his arms in lamb skin so that if his blind father touched him, he would think Jacob his more hirsute brother. Jacob brought Isaac a dish of goat meat prepared by Rebecca to taste like venison. Isaac then bestowed the blessing (bekhorah), which confers a prophetic wish for fertility (vv. 27–28) and dominion (v.29), on Jacob before Esau's return.

Esau is furious and vows to kill Jacob as soon as their father has died. Rebecca intervenes to save her younger son Jacob from being murdered by her elder son, Esau. At Rebecca's urging, Jacob flees to a distant land to work for his mother's brother, Laban. She explains to Isaac that she has sent Jacob to find a wife among her own people.

Jacob does not immediately receive his father's inheritance. Jacob, having fled for his life, leaves behind the wealth of Isaac's flocks and land and tents in Esau's hands. Jacob is forced to sleep out on the open ground and then work for wages as a servant in Laban's household. Jacob, who had deceived his father, is in turn deceived and cheated by his uncle Laban concerning Jacob's seven years of service (lacking money for a dowry) for the hand of Laban's daughter Rachel, receiving his older daughter Leah instead. However, despite Laban, Jacob eventually becomes so rich as to incite the envy of Laban and Laban's sons.

Reconciliation

Genesis 32-33 tells of Jacob and Esau's eventual meeting according to God's commandment in Genesis 31:3 and 32:10 after Jacob had spent more than 20 years staying with Laban in Padan-Aram. The two men prepare for their meeting like warriors about to enter into battle. Jacob divides his family into two camps such that if one is taken the other might escape. Jacob sends messengers to Esau, as well as gifts meant to appease him. 

Jacob gets the name Israel after he wrestles with the Angel of God as he is traveling to Esau. His hip is knocked out of joint but he keeps on wrestling and gains the name. 

After the encounter with the angel, Jacob crosses over the ford Jabbok and encounters Esau who seems initially pleased to see him, which attitude of favour Jacob fosters by means of his gift. Esau refuses the gift at first but Jacob humbles himself before his brother and presses him to take it, which he finally does. However, Jacob evidently does not trust his brother's favour to continue for long, so he makes excuses to avoid traveling to Mount Seir in Esau's company, and he further evades Esau's attempt to put his own men among Jacob's bands and finally completes the deception of his brother yet again by going to Succoth and then to Shalem, a city of Shechem, instead of following Esau at a distance to Seir. The next time Jacob and Esau meet is at the burial of their father, Isaac, in Hebron.

Views of the birthright

The narrative of Esau selling his birthright to Jacob, in Genesis 25, states that Esau despised his birthright. However, it also alludes to Jacob being deceitful.

In Esau's mother and father's eyes, the deception may have been deserved.  Rebecca later abets Jacob in receiving his father's blessing disguised as Esau. Isaac then refuses to take Jacob's blessing back after learning he was tricked, and does not give this blessing to Esau but, after Esau begs, gives him an inferior blessing.

Justus Knecht comments that: "The Wisdom of God, which makes good come out of evil, can be learnt from this story. Almighty God had from the beginning, or rather from all eternity, chosen Jacob to be the heir of His promises. The faults of men (such as Isaac's preference for Esau, Jacob's deceit, and Esau's hatred) could not alter what He had ordained; on the contrary, they served, under the divine guidance, for the accomplishment of it. Jacob, especially, was strengthened in confidence in God, and purified by the very consequences of his deceit, his long exile and servitude. He was by them confirmed in humility and piety, and trained to be a holy man of God, and the worthy heir of the promises."

References

Footnotes

Citations

Sources

Articles about multiple people in the Bible
Biblical patriarchs
Biblical twins
Brothers
Edom
Jacob
Male twins
Prophets of the Hebrew Bible
Sibling rivalry
Sibling duos